Ulug Depe is an ancient Bronze Age site in the foothills of the Kopet Dag Mountains in the Karakum Desert of Kaka District (Kaahka) in the Ahal Province of south-eastern Turkmenistan. It covers around 13 hectares and lies on a mound at a height of about 30 meters, displaying the longest stratigraphic sequence of Central Asia, from the Late Neolithic, represented by Jeitun culture, until the pre-Achaemenid period.

Discoveries
Excavations in the Late Bronze layers also found a "pressure set" for making soma drink. This set, similar to those found in Gonur Depe,

 "... consisted of a huge stone mortar and a pestle, a pressing stone with a half-spheric projection in its centre, and next to it a similar one with a half-spheric deepening."

See also
Yaz culture
Bactria–Margiana Archaeological Complex (BMAC)

References

Further reading
La mission archéologique Franco-Turkmène  

Archaeological sites in Turkmenistan
Achaemenid cities
Ahal Region